Behnampazuki-ye Jonubi Rural District is in the Central District of Varamin County, Tehran province, Iran. At the National Census of 2006, its population was 12,940 in 3,121 households. There were 41,609 inhabitants in 4,719 households at the following census of 2011. At the most recent census of 2016, the population of the rural district was 21,638 in 5,442 households. The largest of its nine villages was Khurin, with 7,223 people.

References 

Varamin County

Rural Districts of Tehran Province

Populated places in Tehran Province

Populated places in Varamin County